WASP-72 (also known as  CD-30 1019) is the primary of a binary star system. It is an F7 class dwarf star, with an internal structure just on the verge of the Kraft break. It is orbited by a planet WASP-72b. The age of WASP-72 is younger than the Sun at 3.55 billion years.

The primary seems to have UV-opaque matter in the line-of-sight, which may originate from atmosphere escaping from WASP-72b or from an unknown object in the interstellar medium. WASP-72 was named Diya in 2019.

A faint stellar companion WASP-72B was discovered in 2020 at a projected separation of 281 AU. It may still be a false positive, with a probability of 0.02%.

Planetary system
The transiting hot Jupiter exoplanet orbiting WASP-72 was discovered by WASP in 2012. Despite the close proximity of the planet to the parent star, orbital decay was not detected as of 2020. The planetary equilibrium temperature is 2210 K, compatible with the measured dayside temperature of 2098 K.

WASP-72b was named "Cuptor" in 2019 by Mauritian amateur astronomers as part of the NameExoWorlds contest.

References

F-type main-sequence stars
Planetary systems with one confirmed planet
Binary stars
Planetary transit variables
Fornax (constellation)
J02440959-3010085
Durchmusterung objects